The 1977–78 season was the 79th completed season of The Football League.

Brian Clough’s Nottingham Forest side took the First Division by storm, first winning the League Cup on 22 March and then confirming themselves as league champions the following month. They joined a small and exclusive company of clubs who have won the league championship one season after promotion.

Manchester United broke the British transfer fee record on 9 February by paying Leeds United £495,000 for Scottish defender Gordon McQueen.

Bob Latchford was the top goalscorer, winning a £10,000 prize offered by a national newspaper for the first footballer to reach 30 goals in a single season, which had not happened in the First Division since the 1971–72 season and in the Second Division since the 1965–66 season.

West Ham United, Newcastle United and Leicester City were relegated from the First Division.

Bolton Wanderers, Southampton and Tottenham Hotspur were promoted from the Second Division, while Blackpool, Mansfield Town and Hull City were relegated

Wrexham, Cambridge United and Preston North End were promoted from the Third Division, while Portsmouth, Port Vale, Bradford City and Hereford United were relegated.

Wimbledon played their first season in the Football League, replacing Workington. Watford, Southend United, Swansea City and Brentford were promoted, while Southport were not re-elected. Southport was the last club to leave the Football League through the re-election process.

Final league tables and results

The tables and results below are reproduced here in the exact form that they can be found at The Rec.Sport.Soccer Statistics Foundation website and in Rothmans Book of Football League Records 1888–89 to 1978–79 with home and away statistics separated.

During the first five seasons of the league, that is, until the season 1893–94, re-election process concerned the clubs which finished in the bottom four of the league. From the 1894–95 season and until the 1920–21 season the re-election process was required of the clubs which finished in the bottom three of the league. From the 1922–23 season on it was required of the bottom two teams of both Third Division North and Third Division South. Since the Fourth Division was established in the 1958–59 season, the re-election process has concerned the bottom four clubs in that division.

First Division

Brian Clough became only the second manager in the history of English football to win the top division title with two clubs, when he guided Nottingham Forest to their first ever top division  title. It was an incredible achievement for a Forest side who were one of just a few teams to win the First Division title a year after promotion. Forest finished seven points above Liverpool, who retained the European Cup. Everton, Manchester City and Arsenal completed the top five, while West Bromwich Albion finished sixth for the second successive season, qualifying for the UEFA Cup again. An exciting Coventry City side finished in 7th position, narrowly missing-out on UEFA Cup qualification. This was the club's second-highest ever league finish, after their sixth position in 1969–70.

Manchester United dipped to 10th place in their first season under new manager Dave Sexton, while Bobby Robson successfully fought off relegation with Ipswich Town and then guided them to their first FA Cup triumph of their history. 

Newcastle United, who had finished fifth a year earlier, endured a terrible season and went down bracketed together with Leicester City at the bottom of the table. The Tynesiders had been in the First Division for 13 years, while Leicester's latest run in the First Division had lasted for seven years. West Ham United occupied the final relegation place, ending their 20-year spell in the First Division.

Stats
Record
Most wins: Nottingham Forest (25)
Fewest losses: Nottingham Forest (3)
Most goals scored: Everton (76)
Fewest goals conceded: Nottingham Forest (24)
Best goal difference ratio: Nottingham Forest (+45)
Most draws: Norwich City (18)
Fewest draws: West Ham United (8)
Most losses: Newcastle United (26)
Fewest wins: Leicester City (5)
Fewest goals scored: Leicester City (26)
Most goals conceded: Newcastle United (78)
Worst goal difference ratio: Leicester City (-44)

Results

Managerial changes

Maps

Second Division

Bolton Wanderers ended their 14-year exile from the top flight by clinching the Second Division title in a tight promotion race between the top four teams. Southampton went up as runners-up, while Tottenham clinched the final promotion place following a final day draw with Southampton. Brighton missed out on a First Division place on goal difference, forcing them to prepare for a fresh assault on reaching the First Division for the first time in their history in 1979.

Hull City, Mansfield Town and Blackpool went down to the Third Division.

Results

Managerial changes

Maps

Third Division

Results

Maps

Fourth Division

Results

Maps

See also
 1977–78 in English football

References

Ian Laschke: Rothmans Book of Football League Records 1888–89 to 1978–79. Macdonald and Jane’s, London & Sydney, 1980.

 
English Football League seasons
1